The Ancient Monuments Act 1931 was an Act of the Parliament of the United Kingdom that aimed to improve the protection afforded to ancient monuments in Britain.

Details

The Ancient Monuments Protection Act 1882 had begun the process of establishing legal protection for some of Britain's ancient monuments; these had all been prehistoric sites, such as ancient tumuli. The Ancient Monuments Protection Act 1900 had continued this process, empowering the government's Commissioners of Works and local county councils to protect a wider range of properties. In 1908 a royal commission concluded that there were gaps between these two pieces of legislation, and the Ancient Monuments Protection Act 1910. These were felt to be unwieldy, and the Ancient Monuments Act repealed all three in 1913, replacing them with the new Ancient Monuments Board to oversee the protection of such monuments. Powers were given for the board, with parliamentary approval, to issue preservation orders and to protect the lands immediately around an ancient monument.

The Ancient Monuments Act was passed in 1931 to deal with gaps in this system. In particular, the new act extended the definition of an ancient monument to include a cave or an underground archaeological artefact; it also extended the powers of the state to manage development in the area around an ancient monument, allowing them to introduce preservation schemes to protect the wider neighbourhood.

References

Bibliography
Mynors, Charles. (2006) Listed Buildings, Conservation Areas and Monuments. London: Sweet and Maxwell. .

United Kingdom Acts of Parliament 1931
Archaeology of the United Kingdom
Archaeology law
Conservation in the United Kingdom